Cyrtillus is a monotypic genus in the family Cerambycidae described by Per Olof Christopher Aurivillius in 1917. Its single species, Cyrtillus albofasciatus, was described by the same author in the same year.

References

Cyrtinini
Beetles described in 1917
Monotypic Cerambycidae genera